James Lowe Peacock III (born 1937) is an American anthropologist.

Peacock studied psychology at Duke University, graduating with a bachelor's degree in 1959. After completing a doctorate in anthropology at Harvard University in 1965, he began teaching at Princeton University. He joined the University of North Carolina at Chapel Hill faculty in 1967. Peacock received a Guggenheim fellowship in 1980, and was named Kenan Professor of Anthropology in 1987. He was president of the American Anthropological Association between 1993 and 1995. Peacock retired from University of North Carolina in May 2015.

References

1937 births
Living people
Duke University Trinity College of Arts and Sciences alumni
Harvard Graduate School of Arts and Sciences  alumni
Presidents of the American Anthropological Association
Princeton University faculty
University of North Carolina at Chapel Hill faculty
20th-century American anthropologists
21st-century American anthropologists